is a Japanese football player for Thespakusatsu Gunma.

Career
After graduating at Tokyo International University and even playing three Emperor's Cup games, Shin signed for YSCC Yokohama in January 2018. In the 2018 season opening game, the forward came on in the 82nd minute against SC Sagamihara.

Club statistics
Updated to 23 August 2018.

References

External links

Profile at J. League
Profile at YSCC Yokohama

1995 births
Living people
Association football people from Saitama Prefecture
Japanese footballers
J3 League players
YSCC Yokohama players
J2 League players
Thespakusatsu Gunma players
Association football defenders